The Roman Catholic Diocese of Barrancabermeja is a Latin suffragan diocese in the Ecclesiastical province of Bucaramanga.

Its cathedral episcopal see is the Catedral del Sagrado Corazón, dedicated to the Sacred Heart, in the city of Barrancabermeja in Santander State, Colombia.

Statistics 
As per 2014, it pastorally served 430,000 Catholics (71.9% of 598,000 total) on 15,000 km², in 34 parishes and 8 missions, with 71 priests (57 diocesan, 14 religious), 1 deacon, 44 lay religious (15 brothers, 29 sisters) and 22 seminarians.

History 
 Established on 2 April 1928 as Territorial Prelature of Río Magdalena, named after the Magdalena River, on canonical territories split off from the Diocese of Nueva Pamplona and Diocese of Socorro y San Gil
 Promoted on 18 April 1950 and renamed after its see as Apostolic Vicariate of Barrancabermeja 
 Promoted on 27 October 1962 as Diocese of Barrancabermeja

Bishops
(all Latin Rite)

Ordinaries

Territorial Prelates of Río Magdalena  
 Father Carlo Ilario Currea, Jesuits (S.J.) (1929.01.08 – 1932)
 Father Raffaello Toro, S.J. (1932.02.20 – 1947)
 Bishop-elect Bernardo Arango Henao, S.J. (1947 – 1950.04.18 see below)

 Apostolic Vicar of Barrancabermeja  
 Bernardo Arango Henao, S.J. (see above 1950.04.18 – 1962.10.27 see below), Titular Bishop of Bela (1950.04.18 – 1962.10.27)

Suffragan Bishops of Barrancabermeja
 Bernardo Arango Henao, S.J. (see above 1962.10.27 – 1983.12.23)
 Juan Francisco Sarasti Jaramillo, Eudists (C.I.M.) (1983.12.23 – 1993.03.25); previously Titular Bishop of Egara (1978.03.08 – 1983.12.23) as Auxiliary Bishop of Cali (Colombia) (1978.03.08 – 1983.12.23); later Metropolitan Archbishop of Ibagué (1993.03.25 - 2002.08.17), Metropolitan Archbishop of above Cali (2002.08.17 – retired 2011.05.18), Apostolic Administrator of Buenaventura (Colombia) (2004.02.21 – 2004.04.29)
 Jaime Prieto Amaya (1993.11.11 – 2009.12.02), later Bishop of Cúcuta (Colombia) (2008.12.01 – death 2010.08.25), Apostolic Administrator of Nueva Pamplona (Colombia) (2009.09 – 2010.03.30)
''Apostolic Administrator Ignacio José Gómez Aristizábal (2009.02 – 2009.12.02), while Metropolitan Archbishop of Santa Fe de Antioquia (Colombia) (1992.10.10 – 2007.01.12)
 Camilo Fernando Castrellon Pizano, S.D.B. (2009.12.02 – 2020.05.29), previously Bishop of Tibú (Colombia) (2001.04.23 – 2009.12.02)
 Ovidio Giraldo Velásquez (2020.05.29 -)

Other priests of this diocese who became bishops
José Figueroa Gómez, appointed Bishop of Granada en Colombia in 2002
Orlando Olave Villanoba, appointed Bishop of Tumaco in 2017

See also 
 Roman Catholicism in Colombia

References

Sources and external links 
 GCatholic.org

Roman Catholic dioceses in Colombia
Roman Catholic Ecclesiastical Province of Bucaramanga
Christian organizations established in 1928
Roman Catholic dioceses and prelatures established in the 20th century